Irundialba waorani is a species of beetle in the family Cerambycidae, and the only species in the genus Irundialba. It was described by Martins & Galileo in 2008.

References

Apomecynini
Beetles described in 2008
Monotypic Cerambycidae genera